Quintin De Cuba    (born September 9, 1987)  is a  Dutch professional baseball first baseman for Curaçao Neptunus in the Dutch Baseball League.

Career 
He played in the Dominican Summer League and Venezuelan Summer League as a member of the New York Mets organization from 2007-2009.

He played with Sparta-Feyenoord in 2011 before joining Kinheim for 2012.

He played for the Netherlands national baseball team in the 2010 South American Games, 2011 World Port Tournament, 2013 World Baseball Classic, and 2015 World Port Tournament.

References

External links

1987 births
2013 World Baseball Classic players
Baseball catchers
Baseball first basemen
Curaçao baseball players
Curaçao expatriate baseball players in Venezuela
Curacao Neptunus players
Dominican Summer League Mets players
Curaçao expatriate baseball players in the Dominican Republic
Living people
People from Willemstad
Venezuelan Summer League Mets players